The Eparchy of Zugdidi and Tsaishi is an eparchy (diocese) of the Georgian Orthodox Church with its seat in Zugdidi, Georgia. It has jurisdiction over Zugdidi and Tsalenjikha municipalities in Georgia.

Heads

See also 
 Eparchies of the Georgian Orthodox Church

References

External links 
 ზუგდიდისა და ცაიშის ეპარქია

Religious sees of the Georgian Orthodox Church
Dioceses established in the 20th century